Chipepo Peter Friday Malwa (born 28 September 1952) is a Zambian politician. He served as Member of the National Assembly for Kapiri Mposhi from 2006 until 2011.

Biography
Prior to entering politics, Malwa worked as a salesman. He contested the Kapiri Mposhi seat as the Movement for Multi-Party Democracy (MMD) candidate in the 2006 general elections and was elected with a majority of 18,000. Following the elections he was appointed Deputy Minister of Energy and Water Development. In 2007 he was moved to the Deputy Minister in the Office of the Vice-President.

In 2008 Malwa became Deputy Minister of Community Development and Social Welfare. However, he was not selected as the MMD candidate for Kapiri Mposhi for the 2011 general elections, later claiming this was because he had refused to bribe party officials. In 2012 he left the MMD to join the Patriotic Front (PF). He then moved to the United Party for National Development (UPND) in 2016 after failing to become the PF candidate in the 2016 general elections. However, after also failing to gain the UPND nomination for Kapiri Mposhi, he returned to the PF.

References

1952 births
Living people
Movement for Multi-Party Democracy politicians
Patriotic Front (Zambia) politicians
United Party for National Development politicians
Members of the National Assembly of Zambia